The Rugby League Premiership was a competition for British rugby league clubs, which operated between 1973 and 1995. As the Super League Premiership the competition continued to operate until 1997.

History
From 1909 until 1973 (except for the period 1962–64) the Rugby Football League Championship had utilised a play-off format to determine the overall league champions. For the 1973–74 season the league was split into two divisions, and a play-off system was no longer used.
In order to maintain interest towards the end of the season a new competition, the "Club Championship", was introduced to replace the championship play-offs. The Harry Sunderland Trophy, which had until then been awarded to the man-of-the-match in the championship final, would instead be awarded to the man-of-the-match in the premiership final.

The first season saw 16 teams take part: the top 12 of the first division and the top four from the second division. The following season saw the title change to "Premiership", and the format was altered so that only the top eight teams in the first division would compete. A similar competition was later instituted for clubs in the lower league(s). The Premiership continued to be played in this fashion until 1995–96, at the time of the switch to a summer sport, when the competition was abandoned to allow the 1996 Super League season to commence in the spring.

A top-four play-off leading to a final, the Super League Premiership, was instituted as part of the Super League competition. In 1998 this was replaced by a return to a play-off for the championships, with the Harry Sunderland Trophy being the award for the Grand Final's man-of-the-match and a single national champion being crowned.

Premiership winners

For completeness, this table includes the 1973–74 Club Championship, and premiership winners from the Super League era.

See also
Super League Grand Final

References

External links

Rugby league competitions in the United Kingdom
1973 establishments in the United Kingdom
1997 disestablishments in the United Kingdom
Premiership
Recurring sporting events established in 1973